East Coast Sessions is a Canadian English language television series. East Coast Sessions debuted on April 1, 2008 at 7:30 p.m. AST on the CBC affiliated Maritime stations. The series would later be broadcast nationally on the CBC-owned specialty channel, bold, beginning September 3, 2008. The series was produced by Geoff D'Eon (This Hour Has 22 Minutes, East Coast Music Awards). It was nominated for two 2008 Gemini Awards in the categories, "Best Music or Variety Program or Series" and "Best Sound in a Music or Variety Program or Series").

Premise
East Coast Sessions is a music performance series where each episode features two artists from Atlantic Canada in an intimate concert setting.

The series was taped over 2 weeks in the summer of 2007 at the CBC's studios in Halifax, Nova Scotia.

Episodes

References

External links
 East Coast Sessions

2008 Canadian television series debuts
2008 Canadian television series endings
2000s Canadian music television series
CBC Television original programming
Television shows filmed in Halifax, Nova Scotia